Nicola Chan-Lam (born 4 November 1991) is a former English badminton player and later represented Mauritius. Chan-Lam competed for Mauritius at the 2014 and 2018 Commonwealth Games. She was one of the 14 players selected for the Road to Rio Program, a program that aimed to help African badminton players to compete at the 2016 Olympic Games. In 2015, she won a bronze medal in the women's singles event and a gold medal in the mixed team event at the African Games.

Personal life
Lives in St Albans and works in London

Achievements

All African  Games 
Women's singles

References

External links

 

1991 births
Living people
Sportspeople from London
Mauritian female badminton players
English female badminton players
Mauritian people of Chinese descent
British people of Chinese descent
Badminton players at the 2018 Commonwealth Games
Badminton players at the 2014 Commonwealth Games
Commonwealth Games competitors for Mauritius
African Games gold medalists for Mauritius
African Games medalists in badminton
African Games bronze medalists for Mauritius
Competitors at the 2015 African Games